Phellinus linteus (Japanese "meshimakobu", Chinese "song gen", Korean "sanghwang", English "mesima", American English "black hoof mushroom") is a mushroom. It is shaped like a hoof, has a bitter taste, and in the wild grows on mulberry trees. The stem color is dark brown to black.

Uses
In Asian traditional medicine, the mushroom is prepared as a tea. Extracts containing polysaccharide-protein complexes from P. linteus are promoted in Asia for potential anti-cancer activities, but there is insufficient evidence from clinical studies to indicate its use as a prescription drug to treat cancer or any disease. Its processed mycelium may be sold as a dietary supplement in the form of capsules, pills or powder.

See also
Medicinal fungi

References

linteus
Medicinal fungi
Fungi of Asia
Taxa named by Miles Joseph Berkeley
Taxa named by Moses Ashley Curtis